Mizrahi Jewish cuisine is an assortment of cooking traditions that developed among the Jews of the Middle East, North Africa, Asia, and Arab countries. Mizrahi Jews have also been known as Oriental Jews (Mizrahi is Hebrew: Eastern or Oriental). 

Jews of the Mizrahi communities cook foods that were and are popular in their home countries, while following the laws of kashrut. The cuisine is based largely on fresh ingredients, as marketing was done in the local souq. 

Meat is ritually slaughtered in the shechita process, and is soaked and salted. Meat dishes are a prominent feature of Shabbat, festival, and celebratory meals. 

Cooked, stuffed and baked vegetables are central to the cuisine, as are various kinds of beans, chickpeas, lentils and burghul (cracked wheat). Rice takes the place of potatoes.

History

Mizrahi Jews are the Jews of the Middle East, and points south and east, largely along the Mediterranean coastal areas and the Levant.  In some countries, there was much mixing of populations after 1492 when the Jews were expelled from Spain.

Cuisine of the Mizrahi Jews includes the cuisines of the Jews of Iraq, Syria, Lebanon, Yemen, Iran (Persia), Afghanistan, Egypt, the Berber communities, Kurdistan, Eastern Caucasus and Georgia.

Some of these communities and cuisine styles overlap with Sephardic communities who fled to many Eastern, Middle-Eastern, and North African countries after the Spanish expulsion.

Coming from the Mediterranean and "sunny" climes, Mizrahi cuisine is often light, with an emphasis on salads, stuffed vegetables and vine leaves, olive oil, lentils, fresh and dried fruits, herbs and nuts, and chickpeas. 

Meat dishes often make use of lamb or ground beef. Fresh lemon juice is added to many soups and sauces. Many meat and rice dishes incorporate dried fruits such as apricots, prunes and raisins. Pine nuts are used as a garnish. Pomegranate juice is a staple of Persian-Jewish cooking.

Kubbeh, a meat-stuffed bulgur dumpling, features in the cooking of many Mizrahi communities. It is served in the cooking broth, as a kind of soup.

Breads

Flatbreads of many varieties are central to middle eastern cooking. Various flatbreads such as pitas, laffa, malawah, and lavash are used instead of challah, which was only used by Ashkenazim of Europe, and in the Turban-shaped variety by Moroccan Jews. Lahoh is a flatbread of the Yemenite Jews with a spongy texture.

Herbs, spices and seasoning blends

Mizrahi cuisine makes liberal use of cumin, pepper, sesame seeds, and various spices common to all Middle-Eastern cuisines.  Saffron, a staple of Sephardic cuisine, is also featured in certain Mizrahi dishes.

Many foods are flavored with seasoning blends or pastes, and light sauces. Hilbah, a paste made from fenugreek seeds and hot pepper, is added to soups and other traditional Yemenite dishes. Skhug, a hot pepper sauce, comes in red and green varieties. A diluted version of skhug is spooned over falafel. Hawaij is a Yemenite spice mixture that comes into two varieties. One, a blend of powdered ginger, cinnamon, cloves and cardamom, is added to coffee and baked goods. The other, a blend of turmeric, black pepper, onion, cumin, cardamom and cloves, is added to soup.

Pastes and sauces are very often served on the side in small dishes on the table during meals, to be added by each diner as desired. Certain spice combinations are characteristic of particular countries, such as coriander and cumin in Egyptian cuisine.

The souqs of the Middle East and North Africa sell ready-made spice blends sold in bulk, but traditionally, Mizrahi Jews bought fresh herbs and prepared their own blends at home to maintain kashrut, fearing insects in the blends sold in the open-air bazaar.

 Adeni hawaij (Aden)—cumin, coriander, black pepper
 Adeni black tea spice (Aden)—cardamom, cinnamon, cloves
 Advieh-e halegh, halegh (charoset) (Iran)—may contain: cinnamon, cloves, ginger, nutmeg, and cardamom (optional)
 Hawaij (Yemen)—black pepper, cardamom, turmeric, saffron
 Kama (Morocco)—black pepper, cumin, ginger, turmeric, nutmeg
 Quatre épices or four spices (Egypt)—cinnamon, nutmeg, allspice, cloves
 Za'tar or zahtar—za'atar, thyme or hyssop with ground sesame seeds, sumac and salt

Desserts

Hot sahlab, a liquidy cornstarch pudding originally flavored with orchid powder (today invariably replaced by artificial flavorings), is served in cups as a winter drink, garnished with cinnamon, nuts, coconut and raisins. Arak from the anis drinks family, is the preferred alcoholic beverage. Rosewater is a common ingredient in cakes and desserts. Malabi, a cold cornstarch pudding, is sprinkled with rosewater and red syrup. 

Ikaddaif or kadaif is a very sweet pastry similar in style and technique to baklavah. It consists of shredded dough, which is wrapped around crushed nuts, baked and then soaked in syrup. It is common in various parts of the Middle East and is served at festive meals.

Cooking techniques
As cooking on Shabbat is prohibited, Mizrahi Jews take advantage of slow-cooking techniques, such as baking on a low temperature overnight, to have available hot dishes on the Sabbath.  This technique is virtually universal to all Jewish cuisines.  One staple of this technique is hamin or chamin (from the word kham, which means "hot"). 

In North Africa this dish is known as dafina. There are many varieties of hamin and dafina, as particularly local spices and ingredients are used, as well as the method of preparation.  Some varieties are denser than others, and some use rice as a staple instead of the common root vegetables.

Bourekas are often served on Shabbat morning. In Yemenite cooking, Shabbat dishes include jachnun and kubbanah.

Shabbat and holiday cooking

Shabbat 
Shabbat foods are often slow-cooked prior to Shabbat, and kept warm overnight once cooked, as cooking is forbidden on Shabbat by Jewish Law.  In Yemenite cooking, Shabbat dishes include jachnun and kubaneh.

Passover 

Mizrahi cuisine allows the use of kitniyot, which is forbidden amongst the Ashkenazim. Kitniyot are legumes and some grains, which include rice and a variety of beans and pulses. 

Whereas charoset in Ashkenazi homes is a blend of chopped apples and nuts spiced with wine and cinnamon, Mizrahi charoset is often based on dried fruits, especially dates, and is much thicker in consistency.

Other Mizrahi Jewish dishes are tebit, a chicken and rice dish, and ingriyi, sweet and sour meat topped with aubergines, both from the cuisine of Iraqi Jews.

Rosh Hashanah 
Makroudh are pastries stuffed with spiced dates and scented with orange-flower water prepared for Rosh Hashanah by Algerian Jews. 

Slow-cooked vegetables stuffed with meat are a popular holiday dish. Moroccan Jews season the stuffing with cinnamon, turmeric, and nutmeg. Holiday meals start with at least a dozen small salads.

Gallery

See also

 Jewish cuisine
 Cuisine of Israel
 Cuisine of the Ashkenazi Jews
 Cuisine of the Bukharan Jews
 Cuisine of the Sephardic Jews
 Cuisine of the Syrian Jews
 Middle Eastern cuisine
 Maghrebi cuisine

References

External links
Persian MIRROR - Cuisine: Basic Cooking

 
Jewish cuisine
Mediterranean cuisine

es:Gastronomía sefardí
tl:Lutuing Sefardi